The 2022–23 Handball-Bundesliga is the 58th season of the Handball-Bundesliga, Germany's premier handball league and the 46th season consisting of only one league. It runs from 1 September 2022 to 11 June 2023.

Teams

Team changes

Stadiums

Standings

Results

Top goalscorers

References

External links
Official website

Handball-Bundesliga
2022 in German sport
2023 in German sport
Ger
2022–23 domestic handball leagues